Harry Borden (born 1965) is a British portrait photographer based in London. His subjects have included celebrities and politicians. Examples of Borden's work are held in the collections of the National Portrait Gallery, London and National Portrait Gallery, Australia.

Early life and education
Borden was born in New York and brought up in Devon. He is the brother of painters Nicholas Borden and Frances Borden. He studied photography at Plymouth College of Art and Design (1985–87).

Life and work
Borden moved to London after graduation, where he worked as an assistant for Lester Bookbinder. He received his first commission from The Observer in 1994. Borden's portraits appeared regularly in this and other Sunday supplements, Harpers & Queen, Vogue and The New Yorker.

In June 2005, he had his first solo exhibition at the National Portrait Gallery (NPG) in London. Harry Borden: On Business included 30 portraits of leading business leaders. The NPG holds more than 100 examples of Borden’s work in its photographic collection.

In 2017 his book Survivor, A Portrait of the Survivors of the Holocaust was published by Octopus. The book had been previously shortlisted for the European Publishers Award for Photography in 2014 and was judged among the 10 best Photography books of 2018 by the Kraszna-Krausz Foundation.
In 2021 his second book Single Dad was published by Hoxton Mini Press.

Personal life
Borden has four children.

Awards
1997: World Press Photo awards
1999: World Press Photo awards
1998: John Kobal Photographic Portrait Award, National Portrait Gallery, London
2000: John Kobal Photographic Portrait Award, National Portrait Gallery, London
2014: Honorary Fellowship of the Royal Photographic Society
2018: Environmental Bursary, 2018 Over 30 Recipient, Royal Photographic Society, Bath

References

External links
 
 Profile at the National Portrait Gallery, London
 "Extraordinary people", Jerusalem Post, 2009.

1965 births
Living people
Photographers from London
Alumni of the Plymouth College of Art